The Nathan Bedford Forrest Boyhood Home is a historic log house in Chapel Hill, Tennessee, U.S.. It was the childhood home of Confederate General and Ku Klux Klan Grand Wizard Nathan Bedford Forrest from 1830 to 1833. It is owned by the Sons of Confederate Veterans.

History
The log house was initially built by W.S. Mayfield in the 1820s. When it was acquired by William Forrest, Nathan Bedford Forrest's father, in 1830, the house was significantly extended. Although Forrest was born in another house, he lived in this house with his parents from 1830 to 1833, and it is "the only home still existing associated with Forrest" in Tennessee. Forrest later served as a general in the Confederate States Army during the American Civil War of 1861–1865. Meanwhile, the house was purchased by Stephen W. Rainey in 1833. It remained a private home for the next four decades.

The house was acquired by the state of Tennessee in the 1970s. Since 1997, it belongs to the Sons of Confederate Veterans (SCV). As of 2017, the "caretaker" of the house is Gene Andrews, a resident of Nashville, Tennessee and a member of the SCV. The house may still be used for "Civil War re-enactments, music and lectures". Moreover, it was the location of the music video for Josephine by Joey + Rory. However, the house is locked behind a "black metal gate".

Architectural significance
The house is "highly representative" of Tennessee's vernacular architecture in the 1820s and 1830s. Indeed, "While most houses in the more settled sections of the state in the 1820s were brick or frame, the farmer or craftsman of the rural areas was still likely to build with logs. Often when prosperity increased, rather than build a new and more imposing house, improvements and additions were made to the log structure."

It has been listed on the National Register of Historic Places since July 13, 1977.

References

Houses on the National Register of Historic Places in Tennessee
Houses completed in 1830
National Register of Historic Places in Marshall County, Tennessee
Boyhood Home
Sons of Confederate Veterans